Vápenný Podol is a municipality and village in Chrudim District in the Pardubice Region of the Czech Republic. It has about 300 inhabitants.

Administrative parts
The village of Nerozhovice and the hamlet of Cítkov are administrative parts of Vápenný Podol.

History
The first written mention of Vápenný Podol is from 1513. It used to be a village with a spa that were founded in the 1720s and were most prosperous in the first half of the 19th century.

References

External links

Villages in Chrudim District